An underwater vehicle is any member of the class of vehicles (machines that transports people or cargo) that is intended to operate in the underwater environment. This article lists the types of underwater vehicle, with a brief description of each type. An underwater vehicle can be crewed, remotely operated or autonomous, and will generally, but not necessarily, have some form of onboard propulsion system.

Types:

 (towed underwater vehicle)
 

 (towed underwater vehicle)

Vehicles